Monte Carmo di Loano is a mountain in Liguria, northern Italy, part of the Ligurian Prealps.  It is located in the province of Savona. It lies at an altitude of 1389 metres.

SOIUSA classification 
According to the SOIUSA (International Standardized Mountain Subdivision of the Alps) the mountain can be classified in the following way:
 main part = Western Alps
 major sector =  South Western Alps
 section = Ligurian Alps
 subsection = Prealpi Liguri
 supergroup = Catena Settepani-Carmo-Armetta
 group = Gruppo del Monte Carmo
 subgroup = Costiera del Monte Carmo
 code = I/A-1.I-A.2.a

Nature conservation 
The mountain and its surrounding area are part of a SIC (Site of Community Importance) called M.Carmo - M.Settepani (code: IT1323112).

References

Mountains of the Ligurian Alps
Mountains of Liguria
One-thousanders of Italy
Natura 2000 in Italy